Renvoizea is a genus of plants in the grass family.

It is native range is north-eastern and south-eastern Brazil.

The genus name Renvoizea is in honour of Stephen Andrew Renvoize (b. 1944), an English botanist who worked at Kew Gardens and was a specialist in grasses. 
It was first described and published in Syst. Bot. Vol.33 on page 294 in 2008.

Known species
According to Kew;

References

Poaceae genera
Plants described in 1845
Flora of Northeast Brazil
Flora of Southeast Brazil
Panicoideae